The 2008–09 Quaid-e-Azam Trophy was one of two first-class domestic cricket competitions that were held in Pakistan during the 2008–09 season. It was the 51st edition of the Quaid-e-Azam Trophy, contested by 22 teams representing regional cricket associations and departments, and was preceded in the schedule by the Pentangular Cup, contested by five teams representing the four provinces and the federal areas.

The format of the competition remained the same as the previous season, with the teams split into two groups of eleven playing four-day matches in a round-robin and a five-day final between the top teams in each group to determine the winner. There were, however, changes to the structure of the groups; whereas the regions are departments were divided evenly between the groups in 2007–08, in 2008–09 the nine departmental teams were in Group A and eleven of the regional teams were in Group B; since both Karachi and Lahore had two teams in the competition, in order to even the groups, one from each was placed in Group A. The Group B match between Quetta and Rawalpindi was completed in 20.1 overs, with a match aggregate of 85 runs being scored. It was the lowest run-aggregate for a completed first-class cricket match, although both sides had forfeited their first innings after no play was possible on the first two days due to bad weather.

Sialkot beat Khan Research Laboratories, who had reached the final on net run rate, by 4 wickets in the final to win the trophy for the second time.

Group stage
The top teams in the round-robin group stage (highlighted) advanced to the final.

Final

Notes

References

External links
 Series home at ESPN Cricinfo

Domestic cricket competitions in 2008–09
2008 in Pakistani cricket
2009 in Pakistani cricket
Pakistani cricket seasons from 2000–01
2008–09 Quaid-e-Azam Trophy